Krehbiel is a form of the surname Graybill. It may refer to:

Henry Edward Krehbiel (1854–1923), American musicologist
Albert Henry Krehbiel (1873-1945), American painter
Fern Krehbiel (1888-1981), American actress whose stage name was Ruth Maycliffe 
Joey Krehbiel (b. 1992), American baseball player
John Krehbiel, Jr. (b. 1938), American businessman

Surnames